The buff-breasted flycatcher (Empidonax fulvifrons) is a small insectivorous bird. It is the smallest Empidonax flycatcher, typically ranging from 11.5 to 13 cm (4.5 to 5 in) in size.

Adults have olive gray upper bodies, darker coloration on the wings and tail, conspicuous white eye rings, white wing bars, small bills, and short tails. The breast of this species is distinctive, washed with a strong orange-buff color.

Their preferred breeding habitat is scrub and open woodlands.   They usually make a cup nest in the forks of trees.  Females usually lay two eggs at a time.

The range of the buff-breasted flycatcher extends from extreme southeastern Arizona in the United States through Mexico to southern Honduras.

These birds are partial migrants, retreating from their northern breeding areas in the United States and northern Mexico for the winter.

To feed, they often wait on an open perch of a shrub or low branch of a tree and fly out to catch insects in flight. They also sometimes pick insects from foliage while hovering.

The song is an alternating versed  PIdew, piDEW.  The call is a loud dry pit.

Subspecies
Various subspecies are recognized:
 Empidonax fulvifrons pygmaeus Coues, 1865 (northern buff-breasted flycatcher or fulvous flycatcher)
 Empidonax fulvifrons fulvifrons (Giraud, 1841)
 Empidonax fulvifrons rubicundus Cabanis & Heine, 1859
 Empidonax fulvifrons brodkorbi Phillips, AR, 1966
 Empidonax fulvifrons fusciceps Nelson, 1904
 Empidonax fulvifrons inexpectatus Griscom, 1932

References

 AviBase

buff-breasted flycatcher
Native birds of the Southwestern United States
Birds of Central America
buff-breasted flycatcher
buff-breasted flycatcher